Abdoulaye Camara (or Abdoulaye Kamara) is a name. People with that name include:

 Abdoulaye Camara (born 1980), Malian former football defender
 Abdoulaye Naby Camara (born 1994), Guinean football defender
 Abdoulaye Paye Camara (born 1995), Guinean football midfielder
 Abdoulaye Kamara (born 2004), Guinean football midfielder